The 1981 Purdue Boilermakers football team represented Purdue University during the 1981 Big Ten Conference football season. Led by Jim Young in his fifth and final season as head coach, the Boilermakers compiled an overall record of 5–6 with a mark of 3–6 in conference play, tying for eighth place in the Big Ten. Purdue played home games at Ross–Ade Stadium in West Lafayette, Indiana.

Several Purdue players ranked among the Big Ten leaders, including the following:
 Wide receiver Steve Bryant led the Big Ten with 60 receptions and 11 receiving touchdowns and ranked second with 971 receiving yards and fifth with 66 points scored.
 Quarterback Scott Campbell ranked second in the conference with 185 pass completions, a 57.6% pass completion percentage, 2,686 passing yards, a 138.3 passing efficiency rating, and 2,809 total yards. 
 Running back Jimmy Smith ranked fourth in the conference with 152 rushing attempts and ninth with 540 rushing yards.

Schedule

Personnel

Game summaries

Notre Dame

Ohio State

Indiana
Statistics
 Jeff Feulner 18 rushes, 108 yards

References

Purdue
Purdue Boilermakers football seasons
Purdue Boilermakers football